Seaford may refer to:

Places

Australia
 Seaford, Victoria
 Seaford railway station, Melbourne
 Seaford, South Australia
 Seaford railway station, Adelaide

United Kingdom
 Seaford, East Sussex
Seaford (UK Parliament constituency)
 Seaford branch line
 Seaford (Sussex) railway station

United States
 Seaford, Delaware
 Seaford, New York
 Seaford (LIRR station)
 Seaford, Virginia
 Seaford Hundred, an unincorporated subdivision of Sussex County, Delaware

People
 John Seaford, Anglican priest
 Richard Seaford, British classicist
 Baron Seaford, a UK peerage

Sports
 Seaford Town F.C., an association football team in Seaford, East Sussex
 Seaford Football Club, an Australian rules football club
 Seaford Rangers FC, an association football team in Seaford, South Australia

Other uses
 Seaford House, a building in London
 Seaford Museum, a museum in Seaford, East Sussex
 Short Seaford, a British flying boat
 HMS Seaford, the name of several ships of the Royal Navy

See also
 Seaforde, a small village in Northern Ireland
Sleaford, a market town in Lincolnshire, England